Craig Nelson (born 28 May 1971, in Coatbridge) is a Scottish former football goalkeeper who last played for Brechin City in Scottish League One. He is currently the goalkeeping coach of the club.

Nelson began his career with Partick Thistle before moving to Ireland to join Cork City in January 1991. He returned to Scotland four months later and went on to make 90 league appearances for Thistle before moving to Heart of Midlothian. He stayed at Tynecastle for two seasons (making 24 league appearances) but left to sign for Falkirk.

He remained there for a further two season before moving on to Ayr United where he became a stalwart in the Somerset Park side, making 150 appearances in his five seasons there. This included playing in the Scottish League Cup 2002 final, which Ayr lost to Rangers 4–0. In 2003, he joined St Johnstone on a free transfer and made 8 appearances before moving to Brechin City on loan in 2004. He made the move permanent a year later and stayed for the next nine seasons.

References

External links

1971 births
Living people
Footballers from Coatbridge
Scottish footballers
Association football goalkeepers
Partick Thistle F.C. players
Cork City F.C. players
League of Ireland players
Heart of Midlothian F.C. players
Falkirk F.C. players
Ayr United F.C. players
St Johnstone F.C. players
Brechin City F.C. players
Scotland B international footballers
Ashfield F.C. players
Scottish Football League players
Scottish Professional Football League players
Scottish expatriate footballers
Expatriate association footballers in the Republic of Ireland
Scottish expatriate sportspeople in Ireland
Scottish Junior Football Association players